The third season of Burmese reality talent show The Voice Myanmar premiered on August 23, 2020 on MRTV-4. Kyar Pauk, Ni Ni Khin Zaw, Yan Yan Chan and R Zarni continued as coaches for this season.

Blind auditions
The first episode of the Blind auditions premiered on August 23, 2020.

Color key

Episode 1 (Aug. 23)

Episode 2 (Aug. 30)

Episode 3 (Sep. 6)

Episode 4 (Sep. 13)

Episode 5 (Sep. 20)

Episode 6 (Sep. 27)

The Battles 
The Battle Rounds were broadcast from Sunday, October 4, 2020, to Sunday, November 1, 2020.

Color key:

The Knockouts 
The Knockout Rounds were broadcast from Sunday, November 8, 2020, to Sunday, November 22, 2020.

Color key:

Live shows
The live shows were aired on November 29.

Color key

Week 1: 1st Live show  (Nov.29)

Week 2: 2nd Live show  (Dec.6)

Week 3: Live show semi-finals (Dec.13)

Week 4: Finale (Dec.20)

References

The Voice Myanmar